Ken Love (May 30, 1928June 19, 2004) was an American stock car racing driver. Love competed in 7 NASCAR Grand National Series races between 1956 and 1958. He also competed in 1 NASCAR Convertible Series race in 1958.

Motorsports career results

NASCAR
(key) (Bold – Pole position awarded by qualifying time. Italics – Pole position earned by points standings or practice time. * – Most laps led.)

Grand National Series

References

External links
 
 

1928 births
2004 deaths
People from Chicago Heights, Illinois
Racing drivers from Chicago
Racing drivers from Illinois
NASCAR drivers